The Punta Negra Dam is a concrete-face rock-fill dam on the San Juan River about  west of San Juan in San Juan Province, Argentina. The purpose of the dam is to provide water for irrigation and the generation of hydroelectric power. Construction began in 2009 and the dam and was finished on August 29, 2015. It is being constructed immediately upstream of a diversion barrage.

References

Dams in Argentina
Concrete-face rock-fill dams
Buildings and structures in San Juan Province, Argentina
Hydroelectric power stations in Argentina
Dams completed in 2015
2015 establishments in Argentina